The United States has 154 protected areas known as national forests, covering . National forests are managed by the U.S. Forest Service, an agency of the U.S. Department of Agriculture. The first national forest was established as the Yellowstone Park Timber and Land Reserve on March 30, 1891, then in the Department of the Interior. In 1897, the Organic Act provided purposes for which forest reserves could be established, including to reserve a supply of timber, protect the forest from development, and secure water supplies. With the Forest Reserve Act of 1891, the president of the United States is given the power to set aside forest reserves in the public domain. With the Transfer Act of 1905, forest reserves became part of the U.S. Department of Agriculture in the newly created U.S. Forest Service.

By 1907, President Theodore Roosevelt had more than doubled the forest-reserve acreage, and Congress responded by limiting the president's ability to proclaim new reserves. The National Forest System underwent a major reorganization in 1908, and in 1911 Congress authorized new additions to the system under the authority of the Weeks Act. The management goals provided by the Organic Act were expanded upon by the Multiple-Use Sustained-Yield Act of 1960 to include "outdoor recreation, range, timber, watershed, and wildlife and fish purposes" as well as for the establishment of wilderness areas.

The additional land areas include 20 national grasslands, 59 purchase units, 19 research and experimental areas, five land utilization projects and 37 other areas. The National Forest System has an extensive and complicated history of reorganization, so while there are currently 154 named national forests, many of these are managed together as either a single forest or separate forests.

There is at least one national forest in all but ten states: Connecticut, Delaware, Hawaii, Iowa, Kansas, Maryland, Massachusetts, New Jersey, North Dakota, and Rhode Island (although Kansas and North Dakota have national grasslands). In addition, Puerto Rico contains El Yunque National Forest, the only tropical U.S. rainforest. Idaho also has the greatest percent of its land in national forests, with 38.2 percent, followed by Oregon (24.7 percent) and Colorado (20.9 percent). On maps, national forests in the west generally show the true extent of their area, but those in the east often only show purchase districts, within which usually only a minority of the land is owned by the Forest Service.

National forests

See also 
 List of former national forests of the United States
 National grassland

Notes 
 Listed names of national forests represent the current management divisions of the National Forest System. Forests that are managed separately, such as Allegheny National Forest and Monongahela National Forest, are listed as separate forests. Forests that are managed together, however, may or may not be listed separately. Forests managed together and with hyphenated names, such as Salmon–Challis National Forest, are considered to be a single national forest. Forests that are managed together under titles such as Grand Mesa, Uncompahgre, and Gunnison National Forests, are considered to be separate forests. National forests listed in this column in small text are constituent national forests managed by, but not included in the name of, the named national forest in normal text. To reach the figure of 154 national forests, count hyphenated names as two forests, with the exception of Manti–La Sal, which is the official name of one forest. Uinta–Wasatch–Cache is counted as three, and George Washington and Jefferson is counted as two.
 In the case of national forests in multiple states, the states are listed in descending order by land area of that forest contained in each state. States with the most area of that forest are listed first, while states with the least are listed last. Coordinates are those by the U.S. Board on Geographic Names, and may not be representative of the entire forest.
 The history of the National Forest System is very complicated. Forests have been transferred between agencies, renamed, divided, consolidated, discontinued, established from parts of existing forests, had portions ceded to other forests, expanded from other lands, among various other actions. The date given represents the day: that forest was established as is, a predecessor forest with the same boundaries was established under a different name, or the earliest date of establishment of a forest that was combined in whole with another forest.
Forests with citations to the three books in the This Land series by Robert H. Mohlenbrock can be found in the section of the cited book that corresponds to that forest. Additional information about a particular forest can be found in this series and at each forest's website.
The LTBMU was formed from existing Forest Service land that was managed by Eldorado, Tahoe, and Humboldt–Toiyabe National Forests. Only  of land in LTBMU is officially designated as LTBMU, and the remainder of the land is still officially designated as the three sources national forests. However, all of this land is managed separately as LTBMU, essentially making it a separate national forest.

References

External links 

 Official website of the United States Forest Service

 National forests
National forests
Forests, national
National forests